3-Dehydroquinic acid (DHQ) is the first carbocyclic intermediate of the shikimate pathway. It is created from 3-deoxyarabinoheptulosonate 7-phosphate, a 7-carbon ulonic acid, by the enzyme DHQ synthase. The mechanism of ring closure is complex, but involves an aldol condensation at C-2 and C-7. 

It has the same structure as quinic acid, which is found in coffee, but the C-3 hydroxyl is oxidized to a ketone group. 3-Dehydroquinic acid undergoes five further enzymatic steps in the remainder of the shikimate pathway to chorismic acid, a precursor to tyrosine, 3-phenylalanine, tryptophan, and some vitamins, including:
 Vitamin K
 Pteroylmonoglutamic acid, called folate.

3-Dehydroquinate can also be a precursor to pyrroloquinoline quinone (PQQ), an alternate redox coenzyme involved in oxidative phosphorylation.

Biosynthesis
3-Dehydroquinate goes through beta oxidation, similar to fatty acids. Then, this compound (6-oxo-3-dehydro-quinate) is transaminated to 6-amino-3-dehydroquinate. Then 6-amino-3-dehydro-quinate is dehydrated and reduced to 6-amino-4-desoxy-3-keto-quinate, which reacts with dehydroalanine and alpha-ketoglutarate, to form hexahydro-pyrroloquinoline quinone. This compound is oxidized by FAD to PQQ.

References

Alpha hydroxy acids
Ketones
Cyclohexanols
Triols